Neoglyphidodon nigroris, commonly known as the black-and-gold chromis or Behn's damsel is a species of damselfish found in the Indo-West Pacific. It occasionally makes its way into the aquarium trade.

Distribution and habitat
This species of damselfish is found throughout the Indo-Pacific region. In the Indian Ocean, they are found
around Sri Lanka, the Andaman Sea, Indonesia, and Australia. In the Pacific Ocean, they are found around Indonesia, the Philippines, Australia, Vietnam, Taiwan, Japan, Malaysia, the Solomon Islands, Vanuatu, and Hawaii. Behn's damselfishes live in coral reefs and lagoons that are rich in corals.

Description
There are two varieties of adult coloration. The adult individuals from the western Pacific Ocean have a tan front and a yellow back. In the area ranging from the Andaman Sea to Japan, adults are black. The two varieties overlap around the island of Bali. Juveniles have a yellow coloration with 2 horizontal black stripes.

Ecology

Diet
Benh's damselfish are omnivorous fish. They feed mainly on algae, crustaceans, tunicates, and salps.

Behavior
This species is normally encountered as a solitary fish. They are territorial fish. As the fish gets older, they get more aggressive and territorial.

In the aquarium
In the aquarium hobby, the juvenile fish is occasionally available for the aquarium trade. It chases smaller fishes but hides in living rocks gap in order to avoid bigger fishes.

Reproduction
During breeding, the females lay their eggs in the substrate. Then, the males guard them and aerate them until they hatch.

References

External links
 

nigoris
Fish of the Indian Ocean
Fish of the Pacific Ocean
Fish described in 1830
Taxa named by Georges Cuvier